Fenwood is a village in the Canadian province of Saskatchewan within the Rural Municipality of Stanley No. 215 and Census Division No. 5.

History 
Fenwood incorporated as a village on June 30, 1909.

Demographics 

Climate

See also 

 List of communities in Saskatchewan
 Villages of Saskatchewan

References

Villages in Saskatchewan
Stanley No. 215, Saskatchewan
Division No. 5, Saskatchewan